Roger Federer defeated John Isner in the final, 7–6(9–7), 6–3 to win the men's singles tennis title at the 2012 Indian Wells Masters. It was his record fourth Indian Wells title.

Novak Djokovic was the defending champion, but lost to Isner in the semifinals.

Seeds
All seeds received a bye into the second round.

Draw

Finals

Top half

Section 1

Section 2

Section 3

Section 4

Bottom half

Section 5

Section 6

Section 7

Section 8

Qualifying

Seeds

Qualifiers

Lucky losers
  Frederico Gil
  Tobias Kamke
  Björn Phau

Draw

First qualifier

Second qualifier

Third qualifier

Fourth qualifier

Fifth qualifier

Sixth qualifier

Seventh qualifier

Eighth qualifier

Ninth qualifier

Tenth qualifier

Eleventh qualifier

Twelfth qualifier

References
 Main Draw
 Qualifying Draw

BNP Paribas Open - Singles
2012 BNP Paribas Open